The Gay Adventure is a 1936 British comedy film directed by Sinclair Hill and starring Yvonne Arnaud, Barry Jones and Nora Swinburne. It was made at Welwyn Studios by the independent company Grosvenor Films. It was based on the 1931 play of the same name by Walter C. Hackett.

Cast
 Yvonne Arnaud as Julie  
 Barry Jones as Darnton  
 Nora Swinburne as Fay d'Allary 
 Betty Worth as Baby  
 Sybil Grove as Miss Darnton  
 Finlay Currie as Porter 
 Guy Middleton as Aram  
 Robert Holmes as d'Allary  
 Anthony Holles as Charles  
 Kenneth Warrington as Mickey Blane 
 Ralph Truman as Buck  
 Percy Parsons as Pete  
 Andreas Malandrinos as Hotel Manager

References

Bibliography
 Low, Rachael. Filmmaking in 1930s Britain. George Allen & Unwin, 1985.
 Wood, Linda. British Films, 1927-1939. British Film Institute, 1986.

External links

1936 films
British comedy films
British black-and-white films
1936 comedy films
Films directed by Sinclair Hill
Films shot at Welwyn Studios
British films based on plays
1930s English-language films
1930s British films
English-language comedy films